Stadion Brühl is a football stadium at Grenchen in the Canton of Solothurn, Switzerland. It is the home ground of FC Grenchen since 1927. Its maximum capacity is 10,964.

The annual Uhrencup tournament is held there.

See also 
List of football stadiums in Switzerland

References

External links 
Station Brühl  basic data

Football venues in Switzerland
Buildings and structures in the canton of Solothurn
Grenchen